Caulerpa hedleyi is a species of seaweed in the Caulerpaceae family.

The species is found in deep heavily shaded waters. In Western Australia, it is found along the coast from Rottnest Island and south as far as Esperance in the Goldfields-Esperance region of Western Australia and east to South Australia.

References

hedleyi
Species described in 1910